Amir Sharafi (born 25 June 1989) is an Iranian footballer.

Club career
Sharafi has played most of his professional career on a number of different teams in Iran. He joined the Iranian football scene in 2008, playing several seasons with Esteghlal Ahvaz, before he was transferred to Foolad, a member of the Persian Gulf Pro League, in 2011. Sharafi played only thirteen games with Foolad FC before he was transferred to Iranjavan FC. From there, he bounced around, spending time with 
Naft Gachsaran FC and Hafari Ahvaz before he joined the squad on Foolad Novin, in 2018, where he continues to play.

Club Career Statistics
Last Update  10 April 2014 

 Assist Goals

References

1989 births
Living people
Esteghlal Ahvaz players
Foolad FC players
Iranian footballers
Footballers at the 2010 Asian Games
Association football midfielders
Asian Games competitors for Iran
People from Ahvaz
Sportspeople from Khuzestan province